Jorrit Kamminga (born 1976) is Director of RAIN+ Ethics, a division of the RAIN Research Group, an international research firm working on the nexus between AI and Defense.

He holds a Ph.D. in International Relations from the Faculty of Constitutional Law, Political Science and Administration at the University of Valencia (July 2014).

Dr. Kamminga specializes in the nexus between security and development, with a focus on Afghanistan and Colombia. He has been a research consultant for several organizations, including the United Nations Office on Drugs and Crime (UNODC) and the German development agency GIZ.

After working in the political section of the Dutch Embassy in Madrid and with the International Council on Security and Development (ICOS) in Paris, London, Kabul, Kandahar and Lashkar Gah, Dr. Kamminga joined Oxfam. For more than six years, he worked for Oxfam in various positions, involving the country contexts of Afghanistan, Pakistan, Palestine, South Sudan, Syria and Yemen.

In January 2021 he left Oxfam.

In addition to his policy analysis and advocacy work, in 2009 Dr. Kamminga has produced the documentary Afghanistan, Land of Wonders, about the experiences of Russian veterans (Afgantsy in Russian) during the Soviet invasion.

In 2011, he worked on Angry Young Men?, a series of videos about the inspirations and challenges of Afghan youth in Kabul and beyond.

In 2020, he worked on the story and script of the graphic story Zahra: A policewoman in Afghanistan.

In 2021, his Dutch book ‘Thanks for nothing Bin Laden: 20 years of the Netherlands in Afghanistan’ was published by Jalapeño Books.

References

External links
International Council on Security and Development (ICOS), ICOS
The Washington Quarterly, "Poppies for Peace: Reforming Afghanistan’s Opium Industry" (Winter 2006–2007, Volume 30 Number 1)
International Herald Tribune, "How to beat the Opium Economy" (November 30, 2006)
Grupo de Estudios Estratégicos, Grupo de Estudios Estratégicos (GEES)
El País, "La nueva estrategia mundial contra la droga" 25 March 2010
United Nations Office on Drugs and Crime (UNDOC), 
University of Valencia, 
London School of Economics (LSE), 
London School of Economics (LSE) Department of Sociology, 
PRNewswire, 

1976 births
Living people
Dutch political scientists
University of Groningen alumni